Mulgrew Nunatak is a prominent nunatak, 1,600 m, standing four nautical miles (7 km) east of Tentacle Ridge in the Cook Mountains of Antarctica. The nunatak was first mapped by the Darwin Glacier Party of the Commonwealth Trans-Antarctic Expedition (1956–1958). Both it and its peak were named for Peter D. Mulgrew, a New Zealand adventurer who accompanied Sir Edmund Hillary to the South Pole and served as the chief radio operator at Scott Base. He perished in the Air New Zealand DC10 scenic flight to Ross Island, 28 November 1979, when the airplane crashed near Te Puna Roimata Peak ("spring of tears" peak) on the northeast slope of Mount Erebus, killing all 257 persons aboard.

References

Nunataks of Oates Land